The Sandstream 26 is a Canadian sailboat, that was built in the late 1980s.

Production
The boat was built by Sandstream Yachts a division of Stanlet Hatch, but it is now out of production. The company built boats from 1985 to 1997 in Stouffville, Ontario, Canada, before going out of business.

Design

The Sandstream 26 is a small recreational keelboat, built predominantly of fiberglass. It has a masthead sloop rig, an internally-mounted spade-type rudder and a fixed fin keel. It displaces  and carries  of steel ballast.

The cabin has  of headroom.

The boat has a PHRF racing average handicap of 243.

See also

List of sailing boat types

Similar sailboats
Beneteau First 26
Beneteau First 265
C&C 26
C&C 26 Wave
Contessa 26
Dawson 26
Discovery 7.9
Grampian 26
Herreshoff H-26
Hunter 26
Hunter 26.5
Hunter 260
Hunter 270
MacGregor 26
Mirage 26
Nash 26
Nonsuch 26
Outlaw 26
Paceship PY 26
Pearson 26
Parker Dawson 26
Tanzer 26
Yamaha 26

References

External links

Keelboats
1980s sailboat type designs
Sailing yachts
Sailboat types built by Sandstream Yachts